Armenians in North Macedonia are the ethnic Armenians in North Macedonia. The number of Armenians is about 300 people.

People
Garabet Tavitjan, musician, member of Leb i Sol
Diran Tavitjan, musician
Garo Tavitjan, Jr., musician
Kosta Balabanov, scientist and honorary consul of Japan in Macedonia
Artur Surmejan, Macedonian tenor,
Hazaros Surmejan, ballet dancer and choreographer
Tigran Kandikjan, football player
Vladimir Kandikjan, university professor
Tatjana Kandikjan, university professor
Vortik Stefan Knalijan, Master of Geographic Sciences and merchant. Owner of trading company since 1990 in manufacturing, agriculture, trade and services

See also 
Armenians in Serbia
Armenians in Bulgaria

References 

Ethnic groups in North Macedonia
Middle Eastern diaspora in North Macedonia